Condemned Women is a 1938 American drama film directed by Lew Landers and written by Lionel Houser. The film stars Sally Eilers, Louis Hayward, Anne Shirley, Esther Dale and Lee Patrick. The film was released on March 18, 1938.

Plot
Linda Wilson does not care about life both outside and inside of jail, but that changes once she falls in love with the prison psychiatrist Dr. Phillip. All is good until she is asked to leave Phillip in order to not damage his career.

Cast 
Sally Eilers as Linda Wilson
Louis Hayward as Dr. Philip Duncan
Anne Shirley as Millie Anson
Esther Dale as Mrs. Clara Glover
Lee Patrick as Anna 'Big Annie' Barry
Leona Roberts as Kate Holt
George Irving as Warden Edmund Miller
Richard Bond as David
Netta Packer as Sarah Norton
Rita La Roy as Cora
Florence Lake as Prisoner

References

External links 
 

1938 films
1938 drama films
1930s prison films
American black-and-white films
American prison drama films
Films directed by Lew Landers
RKO Pictures films
Women in prison films
1930s English-language films
1930s American films